Unión Deportiva Carcaixent is a Spanish football team based in Carcaixent, in the Valencian Community. Founded in 1935, they play in Regional Preferente – Group 3, holding home games at Camp de Fútbol Quatre Camins, which has a capacity of 3,000 spectators.

History
Founded in 1935, the club first reached the Tercera División in 1943. On 14 September 2012, UD Carcaixent merged with CF Atlètic Carcaixent, with the latter club being a part of their structure.

Season to season

26 seasons in Tercera División

References

External links
Official website 
Soccerway team profile

Football clubs in the Valencian Community
Association football clubs established in 1935
1935 establishments in Spain